RSSH or rssh may refer to:

 Kaohsiung Municipal Ruei-Siang Senior High School, in Cianjhen District, Kaohsiung, Taiwan
 rssh, a restricted shell used with OpenSSH
 RSSH is the general formula for a persulfide